Evripidis Stylianidis (also transliterated Evripidis Stilianides) is a Greek politician who has served as Minister for the Interior, Minister for Education and Minister for Transport and Communications. He is a member of New Democracy.

Personal life and education 

Evripidis Stylianidis was born on 8 April 1966 in Maroneia, near Komotini in the Rhodope regional unit of Thrace.

Between 1984 and 1989 he studied at the Law School of the Democritus University of Thrace in Komotini, graduating with a Bachelor's degree. Between 1991 and 1994 he studied at the Law School of the University of Hamburg, graduating with a PhD in constitutional law, before serving in the Artillery Corps of the Hellenic Army between 1994 and 1995.

He is married to Stergioula Papachristou and speaks Greek and German.

Professional life 

From 1991 until 1994, Stylianidis worked at the Greek General Consulate in Hamburg, Germany, cooperating with the Greek Foreign Ministry. Between 1995 and 1996 he was an advisor to the president of the New Democracy political party in Greece in issues concerning youth affairs and cultural diplomacy. From 1997 until 1998, as a European Public Law Center (EPLC) fellow, he taught in the Master's degree programme in public law at the Law School of the National and Capodistrian University of Athens. From 1997 until 2000, Stylianidis was a researcher at European Public Law Center (EPLC).

Political life 

Evripidis Stylianidis first entered politics in 1994 with New Democracy as a Member of the European Parliament nominee.

In 1996 he ran for parliament, but the election law at the time did not enable his party to elect an MP in the Rhodope constituency, albeit it is claimed that he received the most votes. In 2000 he was elected a Member of the Parliament of the Hellenes for the Rhodope Prefecture, and re-elected in 2004. In 2001, he was appointed New Democracy's alternative coordinator for foreign affairs, a position he held until 2004.

He has also been a member of the NATO Parliamentary Assembly and vice president of the Greece–Brazil and Greece–Germany and member of the Greece–Russia Parliamentary Friendship Committees.

In the January 2015 election he won a seat in the parliament. But lost his seat in the September 2015 election.

Ministerial positions 

On 19 September 2007, Evripidis Stylianidis became the Minister for National Education and Religious Affairs.

After a government reshuffle, he was appointed Minister for Transport and Communications on 8 January 2009. After the elections of 7 October 2009, he is a parliament member with the main opposition party of New Democracy.

References 

 
Evripidis Stylianidis biography, Athens News Agency.
Ministers – Evripidis Stylianidis, Hellenic Republic - Ministry of Foreign Affairs.

|-

|-

1966 births
Democritus University of Thrace alumni
20th-century Greek lawyers
Greek MPs 2000–2004
Greek MPs 2004–2007
Greek MPs 2007–2009
Greek MPs 2009–2012
Greek MPs 2012 (May)
Greek MPs 2012–2014
Greek MPs 2015 (February–August)
Living people
Ministers of National Education and Religious Affairs of Greece
Ministers of the Interior of Greece
Academic staff of the National and Kapodistrian University of Athens
New Democracy (Greece) politicians
Ministers of Transport and Communications of Greece
University of Hamburg alumni
Greek MPs 2019–2023
People from Maroneia